No. 204 Squadron was a Royal Air Force unit first formed in March 1915 as No.4 Squadron Royal Naval Air Service.

First World War
No. 4 Squadron Royal Naval Air Service was formed on 25 March 1915 at Dover from the former RNAS Defence Flight. In August 1915 the squadron moved to Eastchurch where it was re-designated as No. 4 Wing RNAS. The squadron was reformed on 31 December 1916 at Coudekerque just outside Dunkirk, France to operate the Sopwith 1½ Strutter. In March 1917 the squadron re-equipped with the Sopwith Pup before it moved to Bray-Dunes, not far away on the French-side of the Franco-Belgian border. In June 1917 the squadron re-equipped again with the Sopwith Camel.

In January 1918 the squadron made a temporary move to Walmer in Kent to rest and refit before returning to the front at Bray-Dunes in March 1918. On the formation of the Royal Air Force on 1 April 1918 the squadron was re-designated No. 204 Squadron. The squadron moved around some of the aerodromes around Dunkirk before settling at Téteghem in May 1918. In October 1918 the squadron moved forward to Heule in Flanders until the end of the war. In February 1919 its personal returned to RAF Waddington in England before being disbanded in December 1919.

Reformation
The squadron was reformed on 1 February 1929, when the coastal reconnaissance flight based at RAF Cattewater (later RAF Mount Batten), Plymouth, equipped with five Supermarine Southampton flying boats, was renumbered. It carried out a regular routine of training, interspersed with a series of formation cruises, including one to the Mediterranean in 1932 and to the Baltic the next year.

It received Supermarine Scapas to replace the elderly Southamptons from August 1935, and in September, it transferred to Aboukir, Egypt, as part of the United Kingdom's response to the Italian invasion of Ethiopia, remaining there until August 1936, when the Squadron returned to Plymouth. It again re-equipped, this time with Saro Londons, from October that year. The squadron continued its routine of training and formation cruises, visiting Gibraltar in August 1937, and visiting Australia to celebrate the 150th anniversary of the founding of Sydney in 1938, being away from Britain from December 1937 to April 1938.

Second World War
The squadron re-equipped with Short Sunderland monoplanes in June 1939, passing its Londons to 240 Squadron. In September 1939, following the start of the Second World War, the squadron began flying convoy escort missions and anti-submarine patrols over the Western approaches. The squadron moved to Sullom Voe in the Shetland Islands in April 1940, carrying out patrols off the coast of Norway as a result of the German invasion of Norway.

In April 1941 the squadron moved to Reykjavík, Iceland, flying patrols over the North Atlantic for five months. In August the squadron's Sunderlands flew to Gibraltar, where they were based for two weeks before moving on to Bathurst (now Banjul), The Gambia to counter the activity of German submarines in the busy shipping lanes off West Africa. It remained at Bathurst until 30 June 1945, when it disbanded. The squadron lost 19 Sunderlands during the Second World War. No Axis submarines were sunk by the squadron, although it did claim at least one German Junkers Ju 88 shot down.

Transport squadron
On 1 August 1947 the squadron was reformed at RAF Station Kabrit, Egypt as a transport squadron and flew Douglas Dakotas,  until these were replaced by Vickers Valettas in July 1949. On 20 February 1953, the squadron was disbanded by being renumbered to No. 84 Squadron RAF.

Return to maritime operations
The squadron was reformed once more on 1 January 1954 at RAF Ballykelly, equipped with Avro Shackletons.

In 1965, Ian Smith's Rhodesian minority white government made a Unilateral Declaration of Independence, leading to United Nations sanctions against what was up until then a British colony. One of the major thrusts of this action was to try and deprive the country of oil. Being land-locked, Rhodesia relied on a pipeline through Mozambique from the port of Beira. Up until 1972, the sanctions were applied by the Royal Navy working with the RAF, which undertook reconnaissance flights of the Beira Straits from its base in Madagascar. The RAF was located at the airfield close to the port of Majunga on the north-west coast of Madagascar. No. 204 Squadron was the unit tasked with this responsibility, just prior to the evacuation and closure of the base in March 1972. It operated a detachment of two Avro Shackleton Mk2s. The last flight took place on 17 March 1972. The squadron was disbanded on 28 April 1972.

Aircraft operated

Squadron bases

Commanding officers

Notes

References

 Halley, James J. Famous Maritime Squadrons of the RAF, Volume 1. Windsor, Berkshire, UK: Hylton Lacy Publishers Ltd., 1973. .
 Halley, James J. The Squadrons of the Royal Air Force & Commonwealth, 1918–1988. Tonbridge, Kent, UK: Air-Britain (Historians) Ltd., 1988. .
 Jefford, C.G. RAF Squadrons, a Comprehensive Record of the Movement and Equipment of all RAF Squadrons and their Antecedents since 1912. Shrewsbury: Airlife Publishing, 2001. .
 Jefford, C.G. RAF Squadrons, a Comprehensive Record of the Movement and Equipment of all RAF Squadrons and their Antecedents since 1912, first edition 1998, Airlife Publishing, UK, .
 Lewis, Peter. Squadron Histories: R.F.C, R.N.A.S and R.A.F., 1912–59. London: Putnam, 1959.
 Rawlings, John D.R. Coastal, Support and Special Squadrons of the RAF and their Aircraft. London: Jane's Publishing Company Ltd., 1982. .
 Rawlings, John D.R. Fighter Squadrons of the RAF and their Aircraft. London: Macdonald and Jane's (Publishers) Ltd., 1969 (new edition 1976, reprinted 1978). .
 Sturtivant, Ray and Gordon Page. Royal Navy Aircraft Serials and Units 1911–1919. Tonbridge: Air-Britain (Historians) Ltd., 1992. .

External links

 RAF Squadron history
 Squadron histories for nos. 201–205 sqn on RafWeb's Air of Authority – A History of RAF Organisation

204
04 Squadron
Military units and formations of the Royal Air Force in World War I
No. 204
Maritime patrol aircraft units and formations
Military of British Ceylon
Military units and formations disestablished in 1972
Military units and formations established in 1915
1915 establishments in the United Kingdom